Huasing Association is a not-for-profit organization in Singapore.

The society aims to provide assistance to scholarship-holders from China, who are attending local tertiary institutions, or who have graduated from local tertiary institutions with a professional degree or diploma and are working or planning to work for any Singapore corporation, educational institute, government body or any other organization.

Assistance is provided such that the above group of Chinese nationals could better understand local culture and environment thus fostering smooth integration into, and stronger bonding with the Singapore society.

The society further aims to promote constructive interaction among its members to facilitate their personal development and career advancement as well as to improve the general well-being of their life in Singapore.

External links
 Huasing

The huasing also provide a forum for Chinese and non-Chinese people to communicate and put up helps and tips for people need it. It will be great fun to work and expand the forum to make it more useful.

Huasing is originated from a Chinese web-based forum. It has been a very good information sharing platform for those people who are new to Singapore. The majority of the forum member are Chinese-nationals. Some Malaysian Chinese are also active in the forum.

Non-profit organisations based in Singapore